The Borneo roundleaf bat or Bornean leaf-nosed bat (Hipposideros doriae) is a species of bat in the family Hipposideridae. It is found in Borneo, Sumatra and Peninsular Malaysia. Hipposideros sabanus is a synonym of this species.

Taxonomy
The Borneo roundleaf bat was described as a new species in 1871 by German naturalist Wilhelm Peters. Peters placed it in the now-defunct genus Phyllorhina, with a scientific name of Phyllorhina doriae. Hipposideros sabanus is used as a synonym of this species.

Description 
The species is small and has dark fur. The bat lacks lateral leaflets, with the posterior nose leaf lacking a supporting septa.

Habitat and distribution 
The bat is found in Malaysia, Borneo, and Sumatra. It inhabits only primary forest and is not known to inhabit disturbed areas.

Conservation 
The bat is listed as near-threatened. The main threats to the bat are that habitat loss due to deforestation, agriculture, plantations and fires. However, the bat is known to occur in some protected areas spread across its range.

References

Hipposideros
Bats of Indonesia
Bats of Malaysia
Mammals of Borneo
Bat, Borneo roundleaf
Least concern biota of Asia
Mammals described in 1871
Taxa named by Wilhelm Peters
Taxonomy articles created by Polbot